Jesse Ventura (born James George Janos; July 15, 1951) is an American politician, actor, and retired professional wrestler. After achieving fame in the World Wrestling Federation (WWF), he served as the 38th governor of Minnesota from 1999 to 2003. He was elected governor with the Reform Party and is the party's only candidate to win a major government office.

Ventura was a member of the U.S. Navy Underwater Demolition Team during the Vietnam War. After leaving the military, he embarked on a professional wrestling career from 1975 to 1986, taking the ring name "Jesse 'The Body' Ventura". He had a lengthy tenure in the WWF/WWE as a performer and color commentator and was inducted into the WWE Hall of Fame class of 2004. In addition to wrestling, Ventura pursued an acting career, appearing in films such as Predator and The Running Man (both released in 1987 and starring fellow muscleman-turned-actor-turned-governor Arnold Schwarzenegger).

Ventura entered politics in 1991 when he was elected mayor of Brooklyn Park, Minnesota, a position he held until 1995. He was the Reform Party candidate in the 1998 Minnesota gubernatorial election, running a low-budget campaign centered on grassroots events and unusual ads that urged citizens not to "vote for politics as usual". In a major upset, Ventura defeated both the Democratic and Republican nominees. Amid internal fights for control over the party, Ventura left the Reform Party a year after taking office and served the remainder of his term as governor as a member of the Independence Party of Minnesota. Since holding public office, Ventura has called himself a "statesman" rather than a politician.

As governor, Ventura oversaw reforms of Minnesota's property tax as well as the state's first sales tax rebate. Other initiatives he took included construction of the METRO Blue Line light rail in the Minneapolis–Saint Paul metropolitan area and income tax cuts. Ventura did not run for reelection. After leaving office in 2003, he became a visiting fellow at Harvard University's John F. Kennedy School of Government. He has since hosted a number of political television shows on RT America and Ora TV, and written several books. Ventura has been a prominent figure in third party politics, having repeatedly floated the idea of running for President of the United States as an independent candidate.

In late April 2020, Ventura endorsed the Green Party in the 2020 presidential election and showed interest in running for its nomination. He officially joined the Green Party of Minnesota on May 2. On May 7, he confirmed he would not run. The Alaskan division of the Green Party nominated Ventura without his involvement, causing the national party to disown it for abandoning its nominee, Howie Hawkins.

Early life
Ventura was born James George Janos on July 15, 1951 in Minneapolis, Minnesota, the son of George William Janos and his wife, Bernice Martha (née Lenz). Both his parents were World War II veterans. Ventura has an older brother who served in the Vietnam War. Ventura has described himself as Slovak since his father's parents were from Slovakia; his mother was of German descent. Ventura was raised as a Lutheran. Born in South Minneapolis "by the Lake Street bridge," he attended Cooper Elementary School, Sanford Junior High School, and graduated from Roosevelt High School in 1969. Roosevelt High School inducted Ventura into its first hall of fame in September 2014.

Ventura served in the United States Navy from December 1, 1969, to September 10, 1975, during the Vietnam War, but did not see combat. He graduated in BUD/S class 58 in December 1970 and was part of Underwater Demolition Team 12.

Ventura has frequently referred to his military career in public statements and debates. He was criticized by hunters and conservationists for saying in a 2001 interview with the Minneapolis Star Tribune, "Until you have hunted men, you haven't hunted yet."

Post-Navy
Near the end of his Navy service, Ventura began to spend time with the "South Bay" chapter of the Mongols motorcycle club in San Diego. He would ride onto Naval Base Coronado on his Harley-Davidson wearing his Mongol colors. According to Ventura, he was a full-patch member of the club and third-in-command of his chapter, but never had any problems with the authorities. In the fall of 1974, Ventura left the bike club to return to the Twin Cities. Shortly after that, the Mongols entered into open warfare with their biker rivals, the Hells Angels.

Ventura attended North Hennepin Community College in Brooklyn Park, Minnesota in suburban Minneapolis during the mid-1970s. At the same time, he began weightlifting and wrestling. He was a bodyguard for The Rolling Stones for a time before he entered professional wrestling and adopted the wrestling name Jesse Ventura.

Professional wrestling career

Early career
Ventura created the stage name Jesse "The Body" Ventura to go with the persona of a bully-ish beach bodybuilder, picking the name "Ventura" from a map as part of his "bleach blond from California" gimmick. As a wrestler, Ventura performed as a heel, resurrecting Gorgeous George's old motto of "Win if you can, lose if you must, but always cheat!", which he emblazoned on his t-shirts. Much of this flamboyant persona was adapted from Superstar Billy Graham, a charismatic and popular performer during the 1970s. Years later, as a broadcaster, Ventura made a running joke out of claiming that Graham stole all his ring attire ideas from him.

In 1975, Ventura made his debut in the Central States territory, before moving to the Pacific Northwest, where he wrestled for promoter Don Owen as Jesse "The Great" Ventura. During his stay in Portland, Oregon, he had notable feuds with Dutch Savage and Jimmy Snuka and won the Pacific Northwest Wrestling title twice (once from each wrestler) and the tag team title five times (twice each with Bull Ramos and "Playboy" Buddy Rose, and once with Jerry Oates). He later moved to his hometown promotion, the American Wrestling Association in Minnesota and began teaming with Adrian Adonis as the "East-West Connection" in 1979. In his RF Video shoot in 2012, he revealed that shortly after he arrived in the AWA he was given the nickname "the Body" by Verne Gagne. The duo won the AWA World Tag Team Championship on July 20, 1980, on a forfeit when Gagne, one-half of the tag team champions along with Mad Dog Vachon, failed to show up for a title defense in Denver, Colorado. The duo held the belts for nearly a year, losing to "The High Flyers" (Greg Gagne and Jim Brunzell).

Move to the WWF, retirement, and commentary

Shortly after losing the belts, the duo moved on to the World Wrestling Federation, where they were managed by Freddie Blassie. Although the duo was unable to capture the World Tag Team Championship, both Adonis and Ventura became singles title contenders, each earning several title shots at World Heavyweight Champion Bob Backlund.

Ventura continued to wrestle until September 1984 after 3 back-to-back losses to world champion Hulk Hogan, when blood clots in his lungs effectively ended his in-ring career. He claimed that the clots were a result of his exposure to Agent Orange during his time in Vietnam. Ventura returned to the ring in 1985, forming a tag-team with Randy Savage and Savage's manager (and real-life wife) Miss Elizabeth. Often after their televised matches Ventura taunted and challenged fellow commentator Bruno Sammartino, but nothing ever came of this.

Ventura participated in a six-man tag-team match in December 1985 when he, Roddy Piper, and Bob Orton defeated Hillbilly Jim, Uncle Elmer, and Cousin Luke in a match broadcast on Saturday Night's Main Event IV. The tag match against the Hillbillies came about after Piper and Orton interrupted Elmer's wedding ceremony on the previous edition of the show; Ventura, who later claimed that he was under instruction from fellow commentator and WWF owner Vince McMahon to "bury them", insulted Elmer and his wife during commentary of a real wedding ceremony at the Meadowlands Arena, by proclaiming when they kissed: "It looks like two carp in the middle of the Mississippi River going after the same piece of corn." According to Ventura, the wedding was real, for at that time the New Jersey State Athletic Control Board would not allow the WWF to stage a fake wedding in the state of New Jersey, so Stan Frazier (Uncle Elmer) and his fiancee had agreed to have a real in-ring wedding.

After a failed comeback bid, Ventura hosted his own talk segment on the WWF's All Star Wrestling TV program called "The Body Shop", in much the same heel style as "Piper's Pit", though the setting was a mock gym (when Ventura was unavailable, "The Body Shop" was often hosted by Don Muraco). He began to do color commentary on television for All-Star Wrestling, replacing Angelo Mosca, and later Superstars of Wrestling, initially alongside Vince McMahon and the semi-retired Sammartino, and then just with McMahon after Sammartino's departure from the WWF in early 1988. Ventura most notably co-hosted Saturday Night's Main Event with McMahon, the first six WrestleManias (five of which were alongside Gorilla Monsoon), and most of the WWF's pay-per-views at the time with Monsoon, with the lone exception for Ventura being the first SummerSlam, in which he served as the guest referee during the main event.

Ventura's entertaining commentary style was an extension of his wrestling persona, i.e., a "heel", as he was partial to the villains, something new and different at the time. McMahon, who was always looking for ways of jazzing things up, came up with the idea of Ventura doing heel commentary at a time when most commentators, including McMahon himself, openly favored the fan favorites.

But Ventura still occasionally gave credit where it was due, praising the athleticism of fan favorites such as Ricky Steamboat and Randy Savage, who was championed by Ventura for years, even when he was a face, a point Ventura regularly made on-air to McMahon and Monsoon. Occasionally he would even acknowledge mistakes made by the heels, including those made by his personal favorites such as Savage or wrestlers managed by heels Bobby Heenan and Jimmy Hart.

One notable exception to this rule was the WrestleMania VI Ultimate Challenge title for title match between WWF Champion Hulk Hogan and the WWF Intercontinental Champion, The Ultimate Warrior. Since they were both fan favorites, Ventura took a neutral position in his commentary, even praising Hogan's display of sportsmanship at the end of the match when he handed over the WWF Championship belt to the Warrior after he lost the title, stating that Hogan was going out like a true champion. During the match, however, which was also the last match at Wrestlemania he called, Ventura did voice his pleasure when both broke the rules, at one point claiming, "This is what I like. Let the two goody two-shoes throw the rule book out and get nasty." Ventura's praise of Hogan's action was unusual for him, because he regularly rooted against Hogan during his matches, usually telling fellow commentator Monsoon after Hogan had won a championship match at a Wrestlemania that he might "come out of retirement and take this dude out".

Hogan and Ventura were at one point close friends, but Ventura abruptly ended the friendship in 1994 after he discovered, during his lawsuit against McMahon, that Hogan was the one who had told McMahon about Ventura's attempt to form a labor union in 1986 before WrestleMania 2. Following a dispute with McMahon over the use of his image for promoting a Sega product, while McMahon had a contract with rival company Nintendo at the time, the WWF owner released Ventura from the company in August 1990.

Ventura later served as a radio announcer for a few National Football League teams, among them the Minnesota Vikings and Tampa Bay Buccaneers.

In February 1992 at SuperBrawl II, Ventura joined World Championship Wrestling as a commentator. WCW President Eric Bischoff ultimately released him for allegedly falling asleep during a WCW Worldwide TV taping at Disney MGM Studios in July 1994, but it has been speculated that the move may have had more to do with Hogan's arrival shortly before.

Litigation
In 1987, while negotiating his contract as a WWF commentator, Ventura waived his rights to royalties on videotape sales when he was falsely told that only feature performers received such royalties. In November 1991, having discovered that other non-feature performers received royalties, Ventura brought an action for fraud, misappropriation of publicity rights, and quantum meruit in Minnesota state court against Titan Sports, asking for $2 million in royalties based on a fair market value share. Titan moved the case to federal court, and Ventura won an $801,333 jury verdict on the last claim. In addition, the judge awarded him $8,625 in back pay for all non-video WWF merchandising featuring Ventura. The judgment was affirmed on appeal, and the case, 65 F.3d 725 (8th Cir.1995), is an important result in the law of restitution. As a result, Ventura's commentary is removed on most releases from WWE Home Video.

Return to the WWF/WWE
In mid-1999, Ventura reappeared on WWF television during his term as governor of Minnesota, acting as the special guest referee for main event of SummerSlam held in Minneapolis. Ventura continued his relationship with the WWF by performing commentary for Vince McMahon's short-lived XFL. On the June 4, 2001, episode of Raw which aired live from Minnesota, Ventura appeared to overrule McMahon's authority and approve a WWF Championship match between then-champion Stone Cold Steve Austin and Chris Jericho. On the March 20, 2003, episode of SmackDown!, Ventura appeared in a taped interview to talk about the match between McMahon and Hogan at WrestleMania XIX. On March 13, 2004, he was inducted into the WWE Hall of Fame, and the following night at WrestleMania XX, he approached the ring to interview Donald Trump, who had a front-row seat at the event. Trump affirmed that Ventura would receive his moral and financial support were he to ever reenter politics. Alluding to the 2008 election, Ventura boldly announced, "I think we oughta put a wrestler in the White House in 2008!". Ventura was guest host on the November 23, 2009, episode of Raw, during which he retained his heel persona by siding with the number one contender Sheamus over WWE Champion John Cena. This happened while he confronted Cena about how it was unfair that Cena always got a title shot in the WWE, while Ventura never did during his WWE career. After that, Sheamus attacked Cena and put him through a table. Ventura then made the match a Table match at TLC: Tables, Ladders and Chairs. During the show, for the first time in nearly 20 years, McMahon joined Ventura ringside to provide match commentary together.

Acting career
Near the end of his wrestling career, Ventura began an acting career. He appeared in the movie Predator (1987), whose cast included future California Governor Arnold Schwarzenegger and future Kentucky gubernatorial candidate Sonny Landham. Ventura became close friends with Schwarzenegger during the production of Predator. He appeared in two episodes of Zorro filmed in Madrid, Spain, in 1991. He had a starring role in the 1990 sci-fi movie Abraxas, Guardian of the Universe. He had supporting roles in The Running Man, No Holds Barred, Thunderground, Demolition Man, Repossessed, Ricochet, The Master of Disguise (in which he steals the Liberty Bell), Ready to Rumble, and Batman & Robin—the first and last of these also starring Schwarzenegger. Ventura made a cameo appearance in Major League II as "White Lightning". He appeared as a self-help guru (voice only) in The Ringer, trying to turn Johnny Knoxville into a more confident worker. Ventura had a cameo in The X-Files episode "Jose Chung's From Outer Space" as a Man in Black alongside fellow 'MiB' Alex Trebek. In 2008, Ventura was in the independent comedy Woodshop, starring as high school shop teacher Mr. Madson. The film was released September 7, 2010.

Filmography

Other media
Ventura was a bodyguard for the Rolling Stones rock band in the late 1970s and 1980s. Its lead singer, Mick Jagger, said of him, "He's done us proud, hasn't he? He's been fantastic."

In the late 1980s, Ventura appeared in a series of Miller Lite commercials.

In 1989, Ventura co-hosted the four episodes of the DiC Entertainment children's program Record Breakers: World of Speed along with Gary Apple. In 1991, the pilot episode for Tag Team, a television program about two ex-professional wrestlers turned police officers, starred Ventura and Roddy Piper.

Ventura also co-hosted the short-lived syndicated game show The Grudge Match alongside sportscaster Steve Albert.

Between 1995 and 1998, Ventura had radio call-in shows on KFAN 1130 and KSTP 1500 in Minneapolis–Saint Paul. He also had a brief role on the television soap opera The Young and the Restless in 1999.

Ventura has been criticized by the press for profiting from his heightened popularity. He was hired as a television analyst for the failed XFL football league in 2001, served as a referee at a WWF SummerSlam match in 1999, and published several books during his tenure as governor. On his weekly radio show, he often criticized the media for focusing on these deals rather than his policy proposals.

From 2009 to 2012, TruTV aired three seasons of the television series Conspiracy Theory with Jesse Ventura.

Ventura had a guest spot on an episode of the 2012 rebooted Teenage Mutant Ninja Turtles animated series on Nickelodeon.

In 2013, Ventura announced a new show, Jesse Ventura: Uncensored, which launched on January 27, 2014, and later renamed Off the Grid, and aired until 2016 on Ora TV, an online video on demand network founded by Larry King.

In 2017, Ventura became the host of the show The World According to Jesse on RT America; the series ended in March 2022 when RT programming produced by its production partner Ora TV was suspended after Russia's invasion of Ukraine. RT America ceased operations on March 3, 2022.

Political career

Mayor of Brooklyn Park

After his departure from the WWF, Ventura took a former high school teacher's advice and ran for mayor of Brooklyn Park, Minnesota in 1990. He defeated the city's 25-year incumbent mayor and served from 1991 to 1995.

Governor of Minnesota

Ventura ran for governor of Minnesota in 1998 as the Reform Party of Minnesota nominee (he later joined the Independence Party of Minnesota when the Reform Party broke from its association with the Reform Party of the United States of America). His campaign consisted of a combination of aggressive grassroots events organized in part by his campaign manager Doug Friedline and original television spots, designed by quirky adman Bill Hillsman, using the phrase "Don't vote for politics as usual." He spent considerably less than his opponents (about $300,000) and was a pioneer in his using the Internet as a medium of reaching out to voters in a political campaign.

He won the election in November 1998, narrowly and unexpectedly defeating the major-party candidates, Republican St. Paul mayor Norm Coleman and Democratic-Farmer-Labor Attorney General Hubert H. "Skip" Humphrey III. During his victory speech, Ventura famously declared, "We shocked the world!" After his election, bumper stickers and T-shirts bearing the slogan "My governor can beat up your governor" appeared in Minnesota. The nickname "Jesse 'The Mind'" (from a last-minute Hillsman ad featuring Ventura posing as Rodin's Thinker) began to resurface sarcastically in reference to his often controversial remarks. Ventura's old stage name "Jesse 'The Body'" (sometimes adapted to "Jesse 'The Governing Body'") also continued to appear with some regularity.

After a trade mission to China in 2002, Ventura announced that he would not run for a second term, saying that he no longer felt dedicated enough to his job and accusing the media of hounding him and his family for personal behavior and beliefs while neglecting coverage of important policy issues. He later told a Boston Globe reporter that he would have run for a second term if he had been single, citing the media's effect on his family life.

Ventura sparked media criticism when, nearing the end of his term, he suggested that he might resign from office early to allow his lieutenant governor, Mae Schunk, an opportunity to serve as governor. He further said that he wanted her to be the state's first female governor and have her portrait painted and hung in the Capitol along with the other governors'. Ventura quickly retreated from the comments, saying he was just floating an idea.

Political positions as governor

In political debates, Ventura often admitted that he had not formed an opinion on certain policy questions. He often called himself "fiscally conservative and socially liberal." He selected teacher Mae Schunk as his running mate.

Lacking a party base in the Minnesota House of Representatives and Senate, Ventura's policy ambitions had little chance of being introduced as bills. He vetoed 45 bills in his first year, only three of which were overridden. The reputation for having his vetoes overridden comes from his fourth and final year, when six of his nine vetoes were overturned. Nevertheless, Ventura succeeded with some of his initiatives. One of the most notable was the rebate on sales tax; each year of his administration, Minnesotans received a tax-free check in the late summer. The state was running a budget surplus at the time, and Ventura believed the money should be returned.

Later, Ventura came to support a unicameral (one-house) legislature, property tax reform, gay rights, medical marijuana, and abortion rights. While funding public school education generously, he opposed the teachers' union, and did not have a high regard for public funding of higher education institutions.

In an interview on The Howard Stern Show, he reaffirmed his support of gay rights, including marriage and military service, humorously stating he would have gladly served alongside homosexuals when he was in the Navy as they would have provided less competition for women. Later, on the subject of a 2012 referendum on amending the Minnesota Constitution to limit marriage to male-female couples, Ventura said, "I certainly hope that people don't amend our constitution to stop gay marriage because, number one, the constitution is there to protect people, not oppress them", and related a story from his wrestling days of a friend who was denied hospital visitation to his same-sex partner.

During the first part of his administration, Ventura strongly advocated for land-use reform and substantial mass transit improvements, such as light rail.

During another trade mission to Cuba in the summer of 2002, he denounced the United States embargo against Cuba, saying the embargo affected the Cuban public more than it did its government.

Ventura greatly disapproved of some of the events at the 2002 memorial for Senator Paul Wellstone, his family, and others who died in a plane crash on October 25, 2002. Ventura said, "I feel used. I feel violated and duped over the fact that the memorial ceremony turned into a political rally". He left halfway through the controversial speech made by Wellstone's best friend, Rick Kahn. Ventura had initially planned to appoint a Democrat to Wellstone's seat, but instead appointed Dean Barkley to represent Minnesota in the Senate until Wellstone's term expired in January 2003. Barkley was succeeded by Norm Coleman, who won the seat against Walter Mondale, who replaced Wellstone as the Democratic nominee a few days before the election.

Ventura, who ran on a Reform Party ticket and advocated for a greater role for third parties in American politics, is highly critical of both Democrats and Republicans. He has called both parties "monsters that are out of control", concerned only with "their own agendas and their pork."

In his book Independent Nation, political analyst John Avlon calls Ventura a radical centrist thinker and activist.

Criticisms of tenure as governor
After the legislature refused to increase spending for security, Ventura attracted criticism when he decided not to live in the governor's mansion during his tenure, choosing instead to shut it down and stay at his home in Maple Grove.

In 1999, a group of disgruntled citizens petitioned to recall Governor Ventura, alleging, among other things, that "the use of state security personnel to protect the governor on a book promotion tour constituted illegal use of state property. For personal gain." The proposed petition was dismissed by order of the Chief Justice of the Supreme Court of Minnesota. Under Minnesota law, the Chief Justice must review recall petitions for legal sufficiency, and, upon such review, the Chief Justice determined that it did not allege the commission of any act that violated Minnesota law. Ventura sought attorney's fees as a sanction for the filing of a frivolous petition for recall, but that request was denied on the ground that there was no statutory authority for such an award.

Ventura was also criticized for mishandling the Minnesota state budget, with Minnesota state economist Tom Stinson noting that the statewide capital gain fell from $9 billion to $4 billion between 2000 and 2001. Ventura had vetoed this budget, but the state legislature overrode him. In 2002, Ventura's poor handling of the Minnesota state budget was also exploited at the national level by CNN journalist Matthew Cooper. When Ventura left office in 2003, Minnesota had a $4.2 billion budget deficit, compared to the $3 billion budget surplus when Ventura took office in 1999.

During his tenure as governor, Ventura drew frequent fire from the Twin Cities press. He called reporters "media jackals," a term that even appeared on the press passes required to enter his press area. Shortly after Ventura's election as governor, author and humorist Garrison Keillor wrote a satirical book about him, Me: Jimmy (Big Boy) Valente, depicting a self-aggrandizing former "Navy W.A.L.R.U.S. (Water Air Land Rising Up Suddenly)" turned professional wrestler turned politician. Ventura initially responded angrily to the satire, but later said Keillor "makes Minnesota proud". During his term, Ventura appeared on the Late Show with David Letterman, in which he responded controversially to the following question: "So which is the better city of the Twin Cities, Minneapolis or St. Paul?". Ventura responded, "Minneapolis. Those streets in St. Paul must have been designed by drunken Irishmen". He later apologized for the remark, saying it was not intended to be taken seriously.

Consideration of bids for other political offices

While Ventura has not held public office since the end of his term as governor in 2003, he has remained politically active and occasionally hinted at running for political office. In an April 7, 2008, interview on CNN's The Situation Room, Ventura said he was considering entering the race for the United States Senate seat then held by Norm Coleman, his Republican opponent in the 1998 gubernatorial race. A Twin Cities station Fox 9 poll put him at 24%, behind Democratic candidate Al Franken at 32% and Coleman at 39% in a hypothetical three-way race. On Larry King Live on July 14, 2008, Ventura said he would not run, partly out of concern for his family's privacy. Franken won the election by a very narrow margin.

In his 1999 autobiography I Ain't Got Time to Bleed, Ventura suggested that he did not plan to run for president of the United States but did not rule it out. In 2003, he expressed interest in running for president while accepting an award from the International Wrestling Institute and Museum in Newton, Iowa. He spoke at Republican presidential candidate Ron Paul's "Rally for the Republic", organized by the Campaign for Liberty, on September 2, 2008, and implied a possible future run for president. At the end of his speech, Ventura announced if he saw that the public was willing to see a change in the direction of the country, then "in 2012 we'll give them a race they'll never forget!" In 2011, Ventura expressed interest in running with Ron Paul in the 2012 presidential election if Paul would run as an independent. On November 4, 2011, Ventura said at a press conference about the dismissal of his court case against the Transportation Security Administration for what he claimed were illegal searches of air travelers that he was "thinking about" running for president. There were reports that the Libertarian Party officials had tried to persuade Ventura to run for president on a Libertarian ticket, but party chairman Mark Hinkle said, "Jesse is more interested in 2016 than he is in 2012. But I think he's serious. If Ron Paul ran as a Libertarian, I think he definitely would be interested in running as a vice presidential candidate. He's thinking, 'If I run as the vice presidential candidate under Ron Paul in 2012, I could run as a presidential candidate in 2016'."

David Gewirtz of ZDNet wrote in a November 2011 article that he thought Ventura could win if he declared his intention to run at that point and ran a serious campaign, but that it would be a long shot.
In late 2015, Ventura publicly flirted with the idea of running for president in 2016 as a Libertarian but allowed his self-imposed deadline of May 1 to pass. He also expressed an openness to be either Donald Trump's running mate or Bernie Sanders's running mate in 2016. Ventura tried to officially endorse Sanders but his endorsement was rejected. Ventura then endorsed former New Mexico Governor Gary Johnson, the Libertarian nominee, saying, "Johnson is a very viable alternative" and "This is the year for a third-party candidate to rise if there ever was one." But in the general election he voted for Jill Stein, the Green Party nominee.

Unauthorized 2020 presidential campaign
Ventura expressed interest in running for president again in 2020, but said he would do so only under the Green Party banner. "The [Green Party] has shown some interest. I haven't made a decision yet because it's a long time off. If I do do it, Trump will not have a chance. For one, Trump knows wrestling. He participated in two WrestleManias. He knows he can never out-talk a wrestler, and he knows I'm the greatest talker wrestling's ever had."

On April 27, 2020, Ventura submitted a letter of interest to the Green Party Presidential Support Committee, the first step to seeking the Green Party's presidential nomination. In May, he announced that he would not run for health reasons, explaining that he would lose his employer-provided health insurance.

Ventura said he would write in his own name in the presidential election, but would support Green candidates in down-ballot races. He said he "refuse[s] to vote for 'the lesser of two evils' because in the end, that's still choosing evil." Ventura received seven presidential delegate votes at the 2020 Green National Convention, having been awarded them through write-in votes in the 2020 Green primaries. Despite the national Green Party nominating Howie Hawkins for president and Angela Nicole Walker for vice president, the Green Party of Alaska nominated Ventura and former representative Cynthia McKinney without Ventura's consent. Ventura and McKinney received 0.7% of the Alaska popular vote.

Political views

Bush Administration and torture
In a May 11, 2009, interview with Larry King, Ventura twice said that George W. Bush was the worst president of his lifetime, adding "President Obama inherited something I wouldn't wish on my worst enemy. You know? Two wars, an economy that's borderline depression." On the issue of waterboarding, Ventura added:

Questions about 9/11
In April and May 2008, in several radio interviews for his new book Don't Start the Revolution Without Me, Ventura expressed concern about what he called unanswered questions about 9/11. His remarks about the possibility that the World Trade Center was demolished with explosives were repeated in newspaper and television stories after some of the interviews.

On May 18, 2009, when asked by Sean Hannity of Fox News how George W. Bush could have avoided the September 11 attacks, Ventura answered, "And there it is again—you pay attention to memos on August 6th that tell you exactly what bin Laden's gonna do."

On April 9, 2011, when Piers Morgan of CNN asked Ventura for his official view of the events of 9/11, Ventura said, "My theory of 9/11 is that we certainly—at the best we knew it was going to happen. They allowed it to happen to further their agenda in the Middle East and go to these wars."

Other endeavors

Post-gubernatorial life
Ventura was succeeded in office on January 6, 2003, by Republican Tim Pawlenty.

In October 2003 he began a weekly MSNBC show, Jesse Ventura's America; the show was canceled after a couple of months. Ventura has alleged it was canceled because he opposed the Iraq War. MSNBC honored the balance of his three-year contract, legally preventing him from doing any other TV or news shows.

On October 22, 2004, with Ventura by his side, former Maine Governor Angus King endorsed John Kerry for president at the Minnesota state capitol building. Ventura did not speak at the press conference. When prodded for a statement, King responded, "He plans to vote for John Kerry, but he doesn't want to make a statement and subject himself to the tender mercies of the Minnesota press". In the 2012 Senate elections, Ventura endorsed King in his campaign for the open Senate seat in Maine, which King won.

In November 2004, an advertisement began airing in California featuring Ventura, in which he voiced his opposition to then-Governor Arnold Schwarzenegger's policies regarding Native American casinos. Ventura served as an advisory board member for a group called Operation Truth, a nonprofit organization set up "to give voice to troops who served in Iraq." "The current use of the National Guard is wrong....These are men who did not sign up to go occupy foreign nations".

In August 2005, Ventura became the spokesperson for BetUS, an online sportsbook.

On December 29, 2011, Ventura announced his support for Ron Paul on The Alex Jones Show in the 2012 presidential election as "the only anti-war candidate." Like Paul, Ventura is known for supporting a less interventionist foreign policy. But after Mitt Romney became the presumptive Republican nominee in May 2012, Ventura gave his support to Libertarian candidate Gary Johnson on June 12, 2012, whom Ventura argued was the choice for voters who "really want to rebel."

In September 2012, Ventura and his wife appeared in an advertisement calling for voters to reject a referendum to be held in Minnesota during the November elections that amend the state constitution to ban same-sex marriage. The referendum was defeated.

Books

Ventura wrote several other books after leaving office. On April 1, 2008, his Don't Start the Revolution Without Me was released. In it, Ventura describes a hypothetical campaign in which he is an independent candidate for president of the United States in 2008. In an interview with the Associated Press at the time of the book's release, Ventura denied any plans for a presidential bid, saying that the scenario was only imaginary and not indicative of a "secret plan to run". On MinnPost.com, Ventura's agent, Steve Schwartz, said of the book, "[Ventura is revealing] why he left politics and discussing the disastrous war in Iraq, why he sees our two-party system as corrupt, and what Fidel Castro told him about who was really behind the assassination of President Kennedy."

Ventura also wrote DemoCRIPS and ReBLOODlicans: No More Gangs in Government, which was released on June 11, 2012. The book expresses Ventura's opposition to the two-party system and calls for political parties to be abolished.

On September 6, 2016, Jesse Ventura's Marijuana Manifesto was released, making the case for the legalization of cannabis and detailing the various special interests that benefit from keeping it illegal.

Conspiracy Theory with Jesse Ventura

In December 2009, Ventura hosted TruTV's new show Conspiracy Theory with Jesse Ventura. "Ventura will hunt down answers, plunging viewers into a world of secret meetings, midnight surveillance, shifty characters and dark forces," truTV said in a statement. On the program, Ventura traveled the country, investigating cases and getting input from believers and skeptics before passing judgment on a theory's validity. According to TruTV, the first episode drew 1.6 million viewers, a record for a new series on the network.

The first season was followed by a second in 2010 and a third in 2012. After three seasons, the show was discontinued in 2013, but as of 2017 it is still shown worldwide on satellite TV.

We The People podcast
On July 31, 2014, Ventura launched a weekly podcast, We The People, distributed by Adam Carolla's "Carolla Digital", which ran until March 4, 2015. Guests included Larry King, Bill Goldberg, Chris Jericho, Roddy Piper, Donald Trump, Mark Dice, and leading members of the 9/11 Truth movement.

Disputes

Navy SEAL background
Bill Salisbury, an attorney in San Diego and a former Navy SEAL officer, has accused Ventura of "pretending" to be a SEAL. He wrote that Ventura blurred an important distinction by claiming to be a SEAL when he was actually a frogman with the UDT. Compared to SEAL teams, UDTs saw less combat and took fewer casualties.

Salisbury described Ventura's Navy training thus:[Ventura] took a screening test at boot camp to qualify for...Basic Underwater Demolition/SEAL (BUD/S) training...Those who completed BUD/S, when [Ventura] was in training, were sent to either a SEAL or an underwater demolition team. Graduation did not, however, authorize the trainee to call himself a SEAL or a UDT frogman. He had to first successfully complete a six-month probationary period in the Teams.Ventura underwent BUD/S training and was assigned to a UDT team. He received the NEC 5321/22 UDT designation after completing a six-month probationary period with Underwater Demolition Team 12. He was never granted the Navy Enlisted Classification (NEC) 5326 Combatant Swimmer (SEAL) designation, which requires a six-month probationary period with SEAL TEAM ONE or TWO. In 1983, eight years after Ventura left the Navy, the UDTs were disbanded, and those operators were retrained and retasked as a SEALs.

Responding to the controversy, Ventura's office confirmed that he was a member of the UDT. His spokesman said that Ventura has never tried to convince people otherwise. Ventura said, "Today we refer to all of us as SEALs. That's all it is." He dismissed the accusations of lying about being a SEAL as "much ado about nothing".

Former Navy SEAL Brandon Webb, the editor of the website SOFREP.com, wrote in a column on the site, "Jesse Ventura graduated with Basic Underwater Demolition Class 58 and, like it or not, he earned his status." He disagreed with the argument that Ventura was a UDT and not a SEAL, saying "try telling that to a WWII UDT veteran who swam ashore before the landing craft on D-Day." "The UDTs and SEALs are essentially one and the same. It's why the UDT is still part of the training acronym BUD/S", Webb wrote.

Lawsuit against the TSA
In January 2011, Ventura filed a lawsuit against the Transportation Security Administration, seeking a declaration that the agency's new controversial pat-down policy violated citizens' Fourth Amendment rights and an injunction to bar the TSA from subjecting him to the pat-down procedures. Ventura received a titanium hip replacement in 2008 that sets off metal detectors at airport security checkpoints.

The U.S. district court dismissed the suit for lack of jurisdiction in November 2011, ruling that "challenges to TSA orders, policies and procedures" must be brought only in the U.S. courts of appeals. After the court's ruling, Ventura held a press conference in which he called the federal judges cowards; said he no longer felt patriotic and would henceforth refer to the U.S. as the "Fascist States of America"; said he would never take commercial flights again; said he would seek dual citizenship in Mexico; and said he would "never stand for a national anthem again" and would instead raise a fist.

Chris Kyle dispute
During an interview on Opie and Anthony in January 2012 to promote his book American Sniper, former Navy SEAL Chris Kyle said he had punched Ventura in 2006 at a bar in Coronado, California, during a wake for Michael A. Monsoor, a fellow SEAL who had been killed in Iraq. According to Kyle, Ventura was vocally expressing opposition to the War in Iraq. Kyle, who wrote about the alleged incident in his book but did not mention Ventura by name, said he approached Ventura and asked him to tone down his voice because the families of SEAL personnel were present, but that Ventura responded that the SEALs "deserved to lose a few guys." Kyle said he then punched Ventura. Ventura denied the event occurred.

Lawsuit 
In January 2012, after Kyle declined to retract his statement, Ventura sued Kyle for defamation in federal court. In a motion filed by Kyle's attorney in August 2012 to dismiss two of the suit's three counts, declarations by five former SEALs and the mothers of two others supported Kyle's account. But in a motion filed by Ventura, Bill DeWitt, a close friend of Ventura and former SEAL who was present with him at the bar, suggested that Ventura interacted with a few SEALs but was involved in no confrontation with Kyle and that Kyle's claims were false. DeWitt's wife also said she witnessed no fight between Kyle and Ventura.

In 2013, while the lawsuit was ongoing, Kyle was murdered in an unrelated incident, and Ventura substituted Taya Kyle, Chris Kyle's widow and the executor of his estate, as the defendant. After a three-week trial in federal court in St. Paul in July 2014, the jury reached an 8–2 divided verdict in Ventura's favor, and awarded him $1.85 million, $500,000 for defamation and $1,345,477.25 for unjust enrichment. Ventura testified at the trial. On August 2014, U.S. District Judge Richard H. Kyle (no relation to Chris Kyle) upheld the jury's award, finding it "reasonable and supported by a preponderance of the evidence." Attorneys for Kyle's estate said that the defamation damages would be covered by HarperCollins's libel insurance. The unjust enrichment award was not covered by insurance. After the verdict, HarperCollins announced that it would remove the sub-chapter "Punching out Scruff Face" from all future editions of Kyle's book. Kyle's estate moved for either judgment as a matter of law or a new trial. In November 2014, the district  court denied the motions.

Kyle's estate appealed to the U.S. Court of Appeals for the Eighth Circuit. Oral argument was held in October 2015, and on June 13, 2016, the appeals court vacated and reversed the unjust-enrichment judgment, and vacated and remanded the defamation judgment for a new trial, holding that "We cannot accept Ventura's unjust-enrichment theory, because it enjoys no legal support under Minnesota law. Ventura's unjust-enrichment claim fails as a matter of law." Ventura sought to appeal the circuit court's decision to the U.S. Supreme Court, but in January 2017, the Supreme Court declined to hear the appeal.

In December 2014, Ventura sued publisher HarperCollins over the same statement in American Sniper. In December 2017, Ventura and HarperCollins settled the dispute on undisclosed terms, and Ventura dropped his lawsuit against both the publisher and Kyle's estate.

Personal life

Family
On July 18, 1975, three days after his 24th birthday, Ventura married his wife Terry. The couple have two children: a son, Tyrel, who is a film and television director and producer, and a daughter, Jade. With the exception of the first two WrestleManias, Ventura always said hello to "Terry, Tyrel and Jade back in Minneapolis" during his commentary at the annual event. Tyrel also had the honor of inducting his father into the WWE Hall of Fame class of 2004, and worked on Conspiracy Theory with Jesse Ventura, including as an investigator in the show's third season.

Ventura and his wife split their time between White Bear Lake, Minnesota and Los Cabos, Baja California Sur, Mexico. Regarding his life in Mexico, Ventura has said:

Health
During his wrestling days, Ventura used anabolic steroids. He admitted this after retiring from competition, and went on to make public service announcements and appear in printed ads and on posters warning young people about the potential dangers and potential health risks of abusing steroids.

In 2002, Ventura was hospitalized for a severe blood clot in his lungs, the same kind of injury that ended his wrestling career.

Religion
Ventura has said that he was baptized a Lutheran.

In 1999, Ventura said in an NBC News interview that he was baptized a Lutheran, but he later came out as an atheist on The Joe Rogan Experience. In a Playboy interview, Ventura said, "Organized religion is a sham and a crutch for weak-minded people who need strength in numbers. It tells people to go out and stick their noses in other people's business. I live by the golden rule: Treat others as you'd want them to treat you. The religious right wants to tell people how to live." In his 1999 bestselling memoir I Ain't Got Time to Bleed, Ventura responded to the controversy sparked by these remarks by elaborating on his views concerning religion:

In April 2011, Ventura said on The Howard Stern Show that he is an atheist and that his beliefs could disqualify him for office in the future, saying, "I don't believe you can be an atheist and admit it and get elected in our country." In an October 2010 CNN interview, Ventura stated religion as being the "root of all evil", remarking that "you notice every war is fought over religion."

As governor, Ventura endorsed equal rights for religious minorities, as well as people who do not believe in God, by declaring July 4, 2002, "Indivisible Day". He inadvertently proclaimed October 13–19, 2002 "Christian Heritage Week" in Minnesota.

Championships and accomplishments
 American Wrestling Association
 AWA World Tag Team Championship (1 time) – with Adrian Adonis
 Cauliflower Alley Club
 Iron Mike Mazurki Award (1999)
 Central States Wrestling
 NWA World Tag Team Championship (Central States version) (1 time) – with Tank Patton
 Continental Wrestling Association
 AWA Southern Heavyweight Championship (2 times)
 George Tragos/Lou Thesz Professional Wrestling Hall of Fame
 Frank Gotch Award (2003)
 NWA Hawaii
 NWA Hawaii Tag Team Championship (1 time) – with Steve Strong
 Pacific Northwest Wrestling
 NWA Pacific Northwest Heavyweight Championship (2 times)
 NWA Pacific Northwest Tag Team Championship (5 times) – with Bull Ramos (2), Buddy Rose (2) and Jerry Oates (1)
 Pro Wrestling Illustrated
 Ranked No. 239 of the top 500 singles wrestlers during the "PWI Years" in 2003
 Ranked No. 67 of the top 100 tag teams of the "PWI Years" with Adrian Adonis
 Ring Around The Northwest Newsletter
 Wrestler of the Year (1976)
 World Wrestling Entertainment
 WWE Hall of Fame (Class of 2004)
 Wrestling Observer Newsletter Awards
 Best Color Commentator (1987–1990)

Electoral history

Bibliography
 I Ain't Got Time to Bleed: Reworking the Body Politic from the Bottom Up (1999) 
 Do I Stand Alone? Going to the Mat Against Political Pawns and Media Jackals (2000) 
 Jesse Ventura Tells it Like it Is: America's Most Outspoken Governor Speaks Out About Government (August 1, 2002, co-authored with Heron Marquez) 
 Don't Start the Revolution Without Me! (2008, co-authored with Dick Russell) 
 American Conspiracies: Lies, Lies, and More Dirty Lies That the Government Tells Us (2010, co-authored with Dick Russell) . Updated and revised edition (2015, co-authored with Dick Russell) 
 63 Documents the Government Doesn't Want You to Read (2011, co-authored with Dick Russell) 
 DemoCRIPS and ReBLOODlicans: No More Gangs in Government (2012, co-authored with Dick Russell) 
 They Killed Our President: 63 Reasons to Believe There Was a Conspiracy to Assassinate JFK (2013, with Dick Russell & David Wayne) 
 Sh*t Politicians Say: The Funniest, Dumbest, Most Outrageous Things Ever Uttered By Our "Leaders" (2016) 
 Marijuana Manifesto (2016)

See also

 List of American politicians who switched parties in office

References

Further reading
 deFiebre, Conrad. "Record-high job approval for Ventura; Many Minnesotans like his style, don't mind moonlighting". Star Tribune July 22, 1999: 1A+.
 deFiebre, Conrad. "Using body language, Ventura backs Kerry". Star Tribune October 23, 2004: 1A+.
 Kahn, Joseph P. "The Body Politic". The Boston Globe February 25, 2004. Accessed April 28, 2004.
 Olson, Rochelle and Bob von Sternberg. "GOP demands equal time; Wellstone aide apologizes; Ventura upset". Minneapolis Star-Tribune October 31, 2002: 1A+.

External links

 
 
 
 
 Minnesota Historical Society
 Issue positions and quotes at On the Issues
 Fact-checking at PolitiFact.com
 
 Off The Grid with Jesse Ventura
 Jesse Ventura at Substack

|-

|-

 
1951 births
Living people
Governors of Minnesota
Mayors of places in Minnesota
Male actors from Minneapolis
Military personnel from Minneapolis
Politicians from Minneapolis
Professional wrestlers from Minneapolis
Radio personalities from Minneapolis
Writers from Minneapolis
American actor-politicians
American anti-war activists
American anti–Iraq War activists
American atheists
American athlete-politicians
American cannabis activists
American color commentators
American conspiracy theorists
American expatriates in Mexico
American former Protestants
American game show hosts
American gun rights activists
American humanists
American male film actors
American male non-fiction writers
American male professional wrestlers
American libertarians
American people of German descent
American people of Slovak descent
American political commentators
American political writers
American talk radio hosts
American television sports announcers
Critics of religions
Former Lutherans
Mongols Motorcycle Club
Professional wrestling announcers
Minnesota Vikings announcers
Tampa Bay Buccaneers announcers
XFL (2001) announcers
MSNBC people
Minnesota Greens
Minnesota Independents
Independence Party of Minnesota politicians
Independent state governors of the United States
Reform Party of the United States of America politicians
Left-wing populism in the United States
Populism in the United States
Non-interventionism
Candidates in the 2020 United States presidential election
Radical centrist writers
United States Navy non-commissioned officers
United States Navy personnel of the Vietnam War
9/11 conspiracy theorists
John F. Kennedy conspiracy theorists
Researchers of the assassination of John F. Kennedy
WWE Hall of Fame inductees
Roosevelt High School (Minnesota) alumni
Harvard Institute of Politics
20th-century American male actors
21st-century American male actors
20th-century American politicians
21st-century American politicians
20th-century American male writers
21st-century American male writers
20th-century American memoirists
21st-century American non-fiction writers
20th-century professional wrestlers
AWA World Tag Team Champions